Oluwarotimi "Timi" Mark Odusina (born 28 October 1999) is an English professional footballer who plays as a defender for  Bradford City.

Career
Odusina signed his first professional contract with Norwich City in 2016.

In January 2019, Odusina signed on loan with National League side AFC Fylde. Odusina made eight league appearances for the club and was a part of the side that won the 2018–19 FA Trophy after beating Leyton Orient 1–0 at Wembley Stadium.

The following season, Odusina moved on loan to fellow National League side Hartlepool United. After impressing on his loan deal, Odusina signed permanently with the North-East side at the start of the 2020–21 season where he won promotion in his first full season with the club.

Odusina made his first appearance in the Football League in August 2021 for Hartlepool in 1–0 win against Crawley Town. At the end of his first season playing in the Football League, Odusina picked up Hartlepool United's Young Player of the Year Award.

In June 2022, Odusina rejected a new contract at Hartlepool and signed for fellow League Two club Bradford City.

Personal life
Born in England, Odusina is of Nigerian descent.

Career statistics

Honours
AFC Fylde
FA Trophy: 2018–19

Hartlepool United
National League play-offs: 2021

References

External links

1999 births
Living people
Footballers from Croydon
English footballers
English people of Nigerian descent
Association football defenders
Norwich City F.C. players
AFC Fylde players
Hartlepool United F.C. players
National League (English football) players
English Football League players